Irene (Greek: Ειρήνη- Eirēnē), sometimes written Irini, is derived from εἰρήνη, the Greek word for "peace". Eirene was the Greek goddess of peace. Irene was also the name of an 8th-century Byzantine empress (Irene of Athens), as well as the name of several saints (see Saint Irene).

Variants
Arina (Russian)
Arisha (Russian)
Eireen (English, Irish)
Eirena (English)
Eirene (English, Greek)
Eirini (Greek)
Eraina (English)
Erayna (English)
Erea   (Galicia)
Erene (English)
Ereni (Greek)
Eriny (Greek, similar to the pronunciation of)
Ira (Russian, Ukrainian)
Ireen (English)
Iren (English)
Irén (Hungarian)
Irena (Croatian, Czech, Dutch, English, Latvian, Lithuanian, Macedonian, Polish, Serbian, Slovak, Slovenian)
Irene (Dutch, English, Italian, Latvian, Spanish, Portuguese)
Irène (French)
Irenea (Spanish)
Irenka (Czech, Polish, Slovak)
Iria (Galician, Portuguese)
Iriana (English)
Iriena (English)
Irin (English)
Irina (Bulgarian, Finnish, Romanian, Russian)
Irine (English)
Irina (Romanian)
Irinka (Russian)
Irinushka (Russian)
Irisha (Russian)
Irja (Finnish)
Irka (Czech)
Iryna (English, Ukrainian)
Reeni (English)
Reeny (English)
Rena (English, Greek)
Rene (English)
Reney (English)
Reni (English)
Renie (English)
Rina (Russian)
Yarina (Russian)
Yaryna (Ukrainian)
Yeran (Armenian)
Yeranouhi (Armenian)
Iryna (Ukrainian)
Irynka (Ukrainian)
Irynochka (Ukrainian)
Irishka (Russian, Ukrainian)

People with the given name
 Irene, baptismal name of Tzitzak (died 750), wife of Byzantine Emperor Constantine V
 Irene of Athens (c. 752–803), wife of Byzantine Emperor Leo IV and empress regnant, 797–802
 Irene of Hungary (1088–1134), empress consort of John II Komnenos of the Byzantine Empire 
 Irene Angelina (fl. late 1100s) 
 Princess Irene of Greece and Denmark (1904–1974), later Duchess of Aosta, Queen of Croatia
 Princess Irene of Greece and Denmark (born 1942)
 Princess Irene of the Netherlands (born 1939)
 Princess Irene of Hesse and by Rhine (1866–1953)
 Saint Irene (disambiguation), various saints
 Eirene (artist), ancient Greek artist
 Irene (singer) (born 1991), South Korean singer
 Irene Agyepong, Ghanaian public health physician
 Irene Kataq Angutitok (1914–1971), Inuit sculptor
 Irene Bedard (born 1967), Native American actress
 Irene Bertschek, German economist
 Irene Bosch, Venezuelan biologist and researcher
 Irene Bridger (21st century), Canadian singer
 Irene Broe (1923–1992), Irish sculptor
 Irene Cara (1959–2022), American singer, songwriter, and actress
 Irene Castle (1893–1969), half of the ballroom dance team of Vernon and Irene Castle
 Irene Charnley (born 1960), South African businesswoman
 Irene Chepet Cheptai (born 1992), Kenyan distance runner
 Irene Dallas (1883-1971), British suffragette
 Irene Diaz, American singer-songwriter
 Irene Dick (born 1949), Curaçaoan politician
 Irene Dölling (born 1942), German sociologist
 Irene Dunne (1898–1990), American actress
 Irene Edgar (born 1957), Scottish lawn bowler
 Irene Eijs (born 1966), Dutch rower
 Irene Emery (1900–1981), American art historian, scholar, curator, textile anthropologist, sculptor, and modern dancer
 Irini Georgatou (b. 1990), Greek tennis player
 Irini Giannatou (1917-2000), birth name of Greek actress and singer Rena Dor
 Irene Gilbert (1934–2011), German-American actress
 Irene Gilbert (swimmer) (1903–1988), British swimmer
 Irene Gilbert (fashion designer) (c.1910–1985), Irish fashion designer
 Irene Hays (born 1953/1954), British civil servant and businesswoman
 Irene Haines, American politician and businesswoman from Connecticut
 Irene Hunt, American children's writers
 Irene ʻĪʻī Brown Holloway, Hawaiian philanthropist
 Irene Jacob (born 1966), French-born Swiss actress
 Irène Joliot-Curie (1897–1956), French scientist
 Irini Karra, Greek fashion model
 Eirini Kavarnou, Greek swimmer
 Irene de Kok (born 1963), Dutch judoka
 Irene Lentz (1901–1962), American fashion and film costume designer, known simply as "Irene"
 Irène Lidova, (1907–2002), Russian-French dance critic
 Irene Luxbacher (born 1970), Canadian artist, author and illustrator
 Irene Manjeri, Ugandan pastor
 Irene McAra-McWilliam, British design researcher and Director of the Glasgow School of Art
 Irene Ovonji-Odida (born 1964), Ugandan lawyer, politician, and women's rights activist
 Irene Papas (born 1926 or 1929), Greek actress
 Irene Piotrowski (born 1941), Lithuanian-Canadian athlete
 Irene Pijoan (1953–2004), Swiss-born American painter, sculptor, and educator
 Irini Psyhrami, Greek pop singer
 Irene Rousseau (born 1941), American artist
 Irene Ryan (1902–1973), American actress
 Irene Saez (born 1961), Venezuelan politician and former Miss Universe
 Irene Skliva (born 1978), Miss World 1996
 Iréne Slättengren (born 1952), Swedish equestrian
 Irene Tedrow (1907–1995), American character actress
 Irini Terzoglou, Greek shot putter
 Irene van Dyk (born 1972), New Zealand netball player
 Irene Vernon (1922–1998), American actress
 Irene Sue Vernon, American professor
 Mother Irini (1936–2006), Egyptian Abbess

References

English given names
Feminine given names
English feminine given names
Dutch feminine given names
Latvian feminine given names
Lithuanian feminine given names
Spanish feminine given names
Portuguese feminine given names
Italian feminine given names
Given names
Given names of Greek language origin
Greek feminine given names
Scottish feminine given names